The 1955–56 Drexel Dragons men's basketball team represented Drexel Institute of Technology during the 1955–56 men's basketball season. The Dragons, led by 4th year head coach Samuel Cozen, played their home games at Sayre High School and were members of the College–Southern division of the Middle Atlantic Conferences (MAC).

The team finished the season 10–8, and finished in 1st place in the MAC in the regular season.

Roster

Schedule

|-
!colspan=9 style="background:#F8B800; color:#002663;"| Regular season
|-

References

Drexel Dragons men's basketball seasons
Drexel
1955 in sports in Pennsylvania
1956 in sports in Pennsylvania